Adam Phillips Leighton, Sr. (April 6, 1851-1922) was an American politician from Maine. He served as Mayor of Portland, Maine from 1908–1909. A resident of the West End, his historic home is located at 261 Western Promenade and is located on the National Register of Historic Places.

Leighton was a businessperson and is considered the "father of the picture post card industry".

Leighton was born in April 1851 on a farm in West Falmouth, Maine and moved with his family to Portland in 1861. He attended local public schools before graduating from Westbrook Seminary. In 1867, at the age of 16, Leighton began work as a clerk with Chisholm Brothers Publishing, which was then owned by future paper magnate Hugh J. Chisholm. He married his wife, Isadore M. Butler, on April 30, 1873. The Leighton family had four children. His youngest, Adam Phillips Leighton, Jr. made his career as a medical doctor.

As Chisholm Brothers expanded and acquired news agency privileges on the Grand Trunk Railway, Leighton advanced in the company. He was placed in charge of the companies business at the Grand Trunk Railway Station. He became vice-president of that operation and pioneered the practice of placing newspapers and magazines on railroad cars. He later became involved in the manufacture of chewing gum.

A staunch Republican, Leighton's time in elected office began in 1891 when he was elected to the Portland City Council. He was re-elected twice to the City Council, served in 1894 as Street Commissioner and to two terms as alderman (1896-1897). In 1908, Leighton defeated Democrat Nathan Clifford for the office of mayor. Six weeks into his first term, Portland City Hall was destroyed in a fire. Leighton chaired a commission to build a new municipal government structure, which was completed in 1911 at the cost of $1,000,000. He unsuccessfully sought to build the new City Hall in Lincoln Park, which was a short distance from the original city hall building. He was easily re-elected for a second term and was replaced in 1909 by Charles A. Strout. Despite an anti-prohibition governor and state legislature, Leighton successfully stopped measures to weaken's Maine longtime prohibition on the consumption of alcohol.

He was a member of the Knights of Pythias and Knights Templar.

References

1851 births
1922 deaths
Maine Republicans
Businesspeople from Maine
People from Falmouth, Maine
Portland, Maine City Council members
Mayors of Portland, Maine
Westbrook College alumni